The white-masked antbird (Pithys castaneus) is a bird species in the family Thamnophilidae. It is endemic to Peru.

Its natural habitat is subtropical or tropical moist lowland forests.
This little-known bird was formerly considered a data deficient species by the IUCN. But new research has found it somewhat rare and declining. Consequently, it is classified as Near Threatened in 2008.

References

 BirdLife International (BLI) (2008): [2008 IUCN Redlist status changes]. Retrieved 2008-MAY-23.

white-masked antbird
white-masked antbird
Birds of the Peruvian Amazon
Endemic birds of Peru
white-masked antbird
Taxonomy articles created by Polbot